Toole Khurd is a village in Ranga Reddy district in Telangana, India. It falls under Yacharam mandal. Khurd and Kalan are Persian words which means big and small respectively.

References

Villages in Ranga Reddy district